|}

The Valiant  Stakes is a Group flat horse race in Great Britain open to mares and fillies aged three years or older.
It is run at Ascot over a distance of 7 furlongs and 213 yards (1,603 metres), and it is scheduled to take place each year in July.

The race was first run 1998 as the Bonusprint Fillies' Conditions Stakes.  It was given its current name and awarded Listed status in 2009.
The race was moved from mid-August to late July as of 2002. It was upgraded to Group 3 from the 2020 running.

Records
Most successful horse:
 no horse has won this race more than once

Leading jockey (3 wins):
 Ryan Moore – Echelon (2005), Strawberrydaiquiri (2009), Sooraah (2011)

Leading trainer (4 wins):
 Sir Michael Stoute – Coy (2004), Echelon (2005), Wasseema (2006), Strawberrydaiquiri (2009)

Winners

See also
 Horse racing in Great Britain
 List of British flat horse races

References

Racing Post:

Flat races in Great Britain
Ascot Racecourse
Mile category horse races for fillies and mares
Recurring sporting events established in 1998
1998 establishments in England